The Ministry of Agriculture, Fisheries and Agrarian Reform (MAFAR), is the regional executive department of the Bangsamoro Autonomous Region in Muslim Mindanao (BARMM) responsible for affairs relating to agriculture, fishing, and agrarian reform in the region.

History
The Ministry of Agriculture, Fisheries and Agrarian Reform (MAFAR) was formed by to manage three sectors in the Bangsamoro Autonomous Region in Muslim Mindanao (BARMM); agriculture, fisheries, and agrarian reform. On February 23, 2019, the first set of Bangsamoro regional government's ministers was appointed including Mohammad Yacob, who became the first agriculture, fisheries, and agrarian reform minister. By December 23, 2019, the functions of the national executive department, the Department of Agrarian Reform (DAR) was transferred to the MAFAR, except adjudicatory functions. The MAFAR and the DAR are set to form a regional agrarian reform adjudication board for Bangsamoro at a future date

Ministers

References

Bangsamoro
Bangsamoro
Agriculture, Fisheries and Agrarian Reform